Kollnburg is a municipality in the district of Regen, in Bavaria, Germany. A part of the municipal area, including the parish village of the same name, is a state-approved resort.

Geography
The community is located in the Donau Forest region in the middle of the Bavarian Forest north of the 1050 m high Proeller between Viechtach (five kilometers) and Sankt Englmar (six kilometers). The two towns of Bogen and Regen are each 27 km away, while Deggendorf and Cham are each 31 km away.

History

Community Planting
The local history is closely connected to its fortress , which was first mentioned in 1153 as Chalnberch. It was still called Kalmperg in 1685, while  and  called it Kohlenburg in their book Der Bavarian Forest, published in 1846. In the "Contributions to the Statistics of the Kingdom of Bavaria" the place is already referred to as Kollnburg in issue XXI from 1869.

Kollnburg belonged to the Barons von Kastner. The place was part of the Electorate of Bavaria, but formed a closed Hofmark, whose seat was Kollnburg.

Incorporation

Population Development
Between 1988 and 2018, the population stagnated or fell minimally from 2800 to 2795 by 5 inhabitants or 0.2%.
 1867: 1027 inhabitants
 1871: 1060 inhabitants
 1961: 2764 inhabitants
 1970: 2695 inhabitants
 1987: 2786 inhabitants
 1991: 2838 inhabitants
 1995: 2905 inhabitants
 2000: 2970 inhabitants
 2005: 2891 inhabitants
 2010: 2894 inhabitants
 2015: 2787 inhabitants

Politics

Municipal Council 
 CSU: 4 seats (33.42% of the votes)
 FW: 5 seats (35.09% of the votes)
 Bürger für Kollnburg: 3 seats (18.76% of the votes)
 GPÖ: 2 seats (12.73% of the votes)

Mayor 
Herbert Preuß (FW) has been the first mayor since May 1, 2020.

Coat of Arms 

The municipal coat of arms of Kollnburg combines elements from the family coats of arms of noble families that were important for the history of the municipal area. The white and blue diamonds are reminiscent of both the Kollnburg (Kallenberger, Chalmberger), the first proven family from the 12th to the 14th century in Kollnburg, as well as the Nußberger, who followed the Kollnburg family in 1363 and possessed the castle up to their defeat in the Böckler War of 1468/69. The Kollnburgers and the Nußbergers originally belonged to the Ministerialis of the Counts of Bogen, who died out in 1242, and therefore have their diamonds in their coat of arms. The formal structure of the coat of arms is based on the fact that the Kollnburgers showed diamonds in a split shield while the Nußbergers arranged them in line. The diamonds were passed on to the Wittelsbach family with the Bogen inheritance in 1242 and later became the Bavarian state coat of arms. The crenellation at the top symbolizes the castle , which was probably built in the 11th century as the ministerial seat of the Counts of Bogen. This coat of arms has been used since 1983.

Architectural and archaeological monuments 

 : Castle ruins with round tower and castle fountain

Statistics 
In 1998, according to official statistics, 10 employees in agriculture and forestry, 136 in manufacturing and 17 in trade and transport had an insurable employment. In other sectors of the economy, 137 people had an insurable employment. There were a total of 895 employees in insurable employment. There were no manufacturing companies, and 6 companies in main construction trades. In addition, in 1999 there were 181 farms with an agricultural area of 2735 ha, of which 2178 ha were permanent grasslands.

Economy and infrastructure

Tourism 
The districts of Kollnburg, Bach, Baierweg, Gnad, Hochstrass, Höfen, Hornhof, Kagermühle, Karglhof, Marktbuchen, Oed, Ogleinsmais, Reichsdorf, Reisach, Sattel, Schreinermühle, Steffelhof, Tafertshof, Unterdornach, Waldhof, Weggütl, Wieshof, and Windsprach are state-recognized as resorts.

Education 
There are the following institutions (status: 1999):
 Kindergarten with 75 kindergarten places and 67 children
 A primary school with 5 classes and 8 teachers in the center of Kollnburg

Personalities 
  (* 1959), labor lawyer and judge at the Federal Labour Court
 Florian Pledl (* 1984), accordionist of

Web Links 
 Municipality of Kollnburg

References